Demchak is a gender-neutral Ukrainian surname. Notable people with the surname include:

Ruslan Demchak (born 1974), Ukrainian politician
William S. Demchak (born 1962), American business executive 
Brandon C. Demchak (born 1987), American filmmaker

See also
 

Ukrainian-language surnames